The 9th Arizona State Legislature, consisting of the Arizona State Senate and the Arizona House of Representatives, was constituted from January 1, 1929, to December 31, 1930, during the first and second years of John Calhoun Phillips's tenure as Governor of Arizona, in Phoenix. The number of senators remained constant at 19, while the number of representatives increased from 52 to 54. The Democrats held large majorities in both houses, although the Republicans made significant inroads in the House.

Sessions
The Legislature met for the regular session at the State Capitol in Phoenix on January 14, 1929; and adjourned on March 14.

There were no special sessions of this legislature during 1929 and 1930.

State Senate

Members

The asterisk (*) denotes members of the previous Legislature who continued in office as members of this Legislature.

Employees
The following held unelected positions within the Legislature:

 Secretary: William J. Graham
 Assistant Secretary: Bridgie Porter
 Sergeant-at-Arms: Ralph Hooker
 Chaplain: Dan P. Jones
 Doorkeeper: John S. Merrill

House of Representatives

Members
The asterisk (*) denotes members of the previous Legislature who continued in office as members of this Legislature. The House grew by five seats from the 8th Legislature: 1 each in Coconino and Maricopa counties.

Employees
The following held unelected positions within the Legislature:

 Chief Clerk: Lallah Ruth
 Assistant Chief Clerk: Ruby Coulter
 Sergeant-at-Arms: O.J. Whitesides
 Chaplain: Reverend C. M. Burkhart

References

 Photograph of the members of the 9th Arizona State Senate

Arizona legislative sessions
1929 in Arizona
1930 in Arizona
1929 U.S. legislative sessions
1930 U.S. legislative sessions